All the Queen's Men is an American drama television series created by Christian Keyes and executive produced by Tyler Perry. It premiered on BET+ on September 9, 2021.

Plot
The one hour drama revolves around the life of Marilyn "Madam" DeVille (played by Eva Marcille). Madam swaggers as a fierce businesswoman who rules all in the lucrative male exotic nightclub industry. Madam is surrounded by a band of trusted employees who are down to make sure that Madam and her empire are successful. As her journey continues, she is hellbent on expanding her Queendom. However, Madam soon discovers that more money and more power mean more problems.

Cast and characters

Main
Eva Marcille as Marilyn "Madam" DeVille
Skyh Alvester Black as Amp "Addiction" Anthony
Candace Maxwell as DJ Dime
Racquel Palmer as Blue
Michael Bolwaire as Doc
Keith Swift as Babyface
Dion Rome as El Fuego
Jeremy Williams as Midnight
Christian Keyes as Raphael "The Concierge" Damascus (season 2—present: recurring, season 1)

Recurring
Julia Pace Mitchell as Ms. Patty 
Bruna Boa Mutunda as Shemika 
Carter the Body as Trouble 
Oshea Russell as Tommy 
Donny Carrington as Red 
Leslie Sheri as Teresa Singleton (season 2) 
J. Marques Johnson as Rayshon (season 2)

Episodes

Season 1 (2021)

Season 2 (2022–23)

Production

Development
The series was picked up by BET+ on February 24, 2021. The series premiered on September 9, 2021.

On February 1, 2022, the series was renewed for a second season.

Casting
The main cast was revealed on March 25, 2021.

On March 17, 2022, J. Marques Johnson joined the cast in a recurring role for the second season.

References

External links

2020s American drama television series
2020s American black television series
2021 American television series debuts
BET+ original programming
English-language television shows
Television series by Tyler Perry Studios
Television series created by Tyler Perry